Mxolisi is a South African masculine given name. Notable people with the name include:

Mxolisi Kaunda (born 1972), South African politician
Mxolisi Lukhele (born 1991), Swazi football player
Mxolisi Mgojo, South African businessman
Mxolisi Mthethwa (born 1978), Swazi football midfielder
Mxolisi Nxasana, Director of Public Prosecutions in South Africa
Mxolisi Sizo Nkosi (born 1967), South African government official

African masculine given names